Snow White and the Seven Jugglers (German: Schneewittchen und die sieben Gaukler) is a 1962 Swiss-West German musical comedy film directed by Kurt Hoffmann and starring Caterina Valente, Walter Giller and Georg Thomalla.

It was shot at the Bavaria Studios in Munich. The film's sets were designed by the art directors Hertha Hareiter and Otto Pischinger.

Cast
 Caterina Valente as Dr. Anita Rossi
 Walter Giller as 	Norbert Lang, Hotelier
 Hanne Wieder as Ines del Mar
 Georg Thomalla as Clown Lukas
 Rudolf Rhomberg as Artist Simson
 Ernst Waldow as Subdirektor Säuberlich
 Günther Schramm as Schulreiter Marcel
 Helmut Brasch as Dompteur Toni
 Otto Storr as Wenzel Clown
 Gaston Palmer as Roderich Clown
 Aladar Hudi as Vitali Messerwerfer
 Peter W. Staub as 	Burghalter, Friseur
 Zarli Carigiet as Staufinger Holzhändler
 Horst Tappert as Hugendobler, Künstleragent
 Inigo Gallo as Diener Pedro
 Henry Vahl as Mr. Peterson, Hotelgast
 Klaus Havenstein as Kämpfi Agent
 Albert Pulmann as 	Flädli
 Selma Urfer as Miss Peabody
 Doris Kiesow as Frau Wuppertal
 Paul Birgs as Herr Wuppertal
 Ellinor Richter as Madame Tercier
 Osman Ragheb as Abdullah
 Rezci Alemzadeh as Mingo
 Erich Sehnke as Alberto
 Henry van Lyck as 	Koch
 Kurt Bülau as 	Koch
 Hannes Ganz as Koch
 Edgar Wenzel as Kellner Alfonso
 Klaus Delonge as Kellner
 Erhard Meissner as 	Kellner
 Richard Rüdiger as Kellner
 Karl Wagner as Geschäftsführer im Warenhaus

References

Bibliography 
 Bock, Hans-Michael & Bergfelder, Tim. The Concise CineGraph. Encyclopedia of German Cinema. Berghahn Books, 2009.

External links 
 

1962 films
West German films
Swiss comedy films
German comedy films
1962 comedy films
1960s German-language films
Films directed by Kurt Hoffmann
Constantin Film films
Films shot at Bavaria Studios
Films shot in Switzerland
1960s German films